Professor Ratbaggy is a sometime four-piece band based in Melbourne, Australia. Sometimes thought of as a side-project of iconic Australian singer-songwriter Paul Kelly, the band is in fact its own entity: Kelly is one of the four members (song writing generally shared).

The band's name is derived from the 1960s Australian TV character "Professor Ratbaggy", who was a bumbling but kind-hearted scientist, a comical character, performed by Ernie Carroll on GTV-9 on Melbourne television.

Steve Hadley, Bruce Haymes and Peter Luscombe would frequently play as The Casuals, as well as being members of Kelly's regular band.

Professor Ratbaggy's songs are often instrumental and purely groove-based with reggae, dub and funk influences.

Professor Ratbaggy members and Shane O'Mara provided the original music for Lantana (2001) and are featured on the EMI soundtrack of the same name. The band's song, "Love Letter" (from their self-titled 1999 album) was used on ABC-TV series Fireflies (2004) together with songs by Paul Kelly (alone and with other bands) and by other artists.

With Kelly often busy with his solo career and work in film and TV composition, Professor Ratbaggy's live shows have all but ceased and their recorded output remains low; this is not to say that the concept has died and there remains a strong possibility of further playing and/or recording.

Personnel
 Steve Hadley – bass, backing vocals
 Bruce Haymes – keyboards, organ, backing vocals
 Paul Kelly – guitar, vocals
 Peter Luscombe – drums

Discography

Studio albums

Soundtrack albums
 Lantana (2001)

EP
 Coma (1999)

References

Musical groups established in 1999
Paul Kelly (Australian musician)
Victoria (Australia) musical groups
1999 establishments in Australia